The Ministry of Livestock, Agriculture, and Fisheries of Uruguay is the ministry of the Government of Uruguay responsible for proposing and carrying out the government policy on agricultural, livestock and fishery resources. The ministry is also responsible for the permanent development of the agricultural, agroindustrial and fisheries sectors, promoting their insertion in both regional and extra-regional external markets, based on the management and sustainable use of natural resources.

This government department is headquartered in Constituyente Road in Barrio Cordón, Montevideo. The current Minister of Livestock, Agriculture, and Fisheries is Fernando Mattos Costa, who has held the position since June 27, 2021.

Creation 
On March 19, 1935, after the dissolution of the Ministry of Industry, the Ministry of Industries and Labor and the Ministry of Livestock and Agriculture were created through the approval of Law No. 9,463. On July 11, 1974, its name was modified to the Ministry of Agriculture and Fisheries. It is not until April 1986 that it received the current name.

List of Ministers of Livestock, Agriculture, and Fisheries 

¹ Ministers  of the Military-Civic government (1973–1985).

See also 

 Agriculture in Uruguay

References 

Agriculture in Uruguay
Government ministries of Uruguay